Tereblia is a village in Zakarpattia Oblast (province) of western Ukraine. The village is located around 11 km north of Tiachiv, on the river Tereblia. Administratively, the village belongs to the Tiachiv Raion, Zakarpattia Oblast. , its population was 3,705.

References

Villages in Tiachiv Raion